Avdotya Yakovlevna Panaeva, née Bryanskaya, ( – ), was a Russian novelist, short story writer, memoirist and literary salon holder. She published much of her work under the pseudonym V. Stanitsky.

Biography
Avdotya Bryanskaya was born in Saint Petersburg into an artistic family. Her father, Yakov Bryansky, was a tragic actor of the classical school, while her mother, A. M. Stepanova, sang opera and appeared in dramas. Avdotya studied in the Saint Petersburg State Theatre Arts Academy but never established a career in the theater.

In 1837, she married the writer Ivan Panaev and entered the close circle of his literary friends. In 1846, she became the common-law wife of Nikolay Nekrasov and spent the next 15 years with him. She collaborated with both writers and published many novels and stories of her own. She and Nekrasov published two novels together: Three Parts of the World (1848–49) and The Dead Lake (1851). Her fiction deals with the social problems of the times, and particularly with the emancipation of women, as in her novel A Woman's Lot (1862).

After Panaev and Nekrasov took over the journal Sovremennik, Panaeva frequently contributed fiction and articles. During the last illness of the Sovremennik critic Nikolay Dobrolyubov, Panaeva acted as his nurse and as a mother figure to his younger brothers.

In 1845, Fyodor Dostoyevsky read his first novel Poor Folk to a literary gathering organized by Panaeva and Ivan Panaev. Dostoyevsky became a frequent visitor to the important literary salon run by Panaeva. Dostoyevsky stopped attending the salon after quarreling with Ivan Turgenev, a fellow visitor. Other salon visitors included Leo Tolstoy, Ivan Goncharov, Alexander Herzen, Vissarion Belinsky and Nikolai Chernyshevsky.

Her memoirs, Memories (1889), while not always factually accurate, contain interesting portraits of her contemporaries, and are an important source of information on the Russian literary scene of the 1840s and 1850s.

Panaeva had one daughter, Yevdokia Nagrodskaya (1866–1930), by her second husband Apollon Golovachev. Yevdokia was also a writer.

References

External links

 
Panaeva's works at Lib.ru 

1820 births
1893 deaths
Russian women novelists
Writers from Saint Petersburg
Women writers from the Russian Empire
Memoirists from the Russian Empire
Short story writers from the Russian Empire
Pseudonymous women writers
Salon holders from the Russian Empire
Women memoirists
Russian State Institute of Performing Arts alumni
19th-century memoirists
19th-century pseudonymous writers